The Oakland Larks were a Negro league baseball team in the West Coast Negro Baseball League, based in Oakland, California, in 1946.

Pitchers Lionel Wilson, who went on to be Oakland's first African American mayor, and Sam Jones, who won 102 games in the Major Leagues, both played for the Larks.

References

African-American history in Oakland, California
Negro league baseball teams
Sports teams in Oakland, California
Defunct baseball teams in California
Baseball teams disestablished in 1946
Baseball teams established in 1946